The Elkader Downtown Historic District is a nationally recognized historic district located in Elkader, Iowa, United States.  It was listed on the National Register of Historic Places in 2012.  The district cover's the city's central business district, mainly along Main Street, but also along the intersecting side streets as well.  Main Street slopes from north to south with a steep drop toward the Turkey River on the east side of the district.  Most of the buildings are masonry, two-story, Victorian structures. There are some one- and three-story buildings as well.  The Elkader Opera House (1903), which is located in the district, is individually listed on the National Register.

References

Elkader, Iowa
National Register of Historic Places in Clayton County, Iowa
Historic districts in Clayton County, Iowa
Historic districts on the National Register of Historic Places in Iowa